The Boss of It All is a 2006 experimental comedy film written and directed by Lars von Trier. The film uses a cinematic technique invented by von Trier himself called Automavision, which automatically determines framing by randomly tilting, panning or zooming the camera without being actively operated by the cinematographer.

Plot
The owner of an IT company, Ravn, wishes to sell it. But, for years, he has pretended that the real boss lives in America and communicates with the staff only by e-mail. That way, all the unpopular decisions can be attributed to the absentee manager, while all the popular ones to him directly.  But now, the prospective buyer insists on meeting the big boss in person. In a panic, the owner hires a failed, over-intellectualizing actor to portray this imaginary boss, and the actor proceeds to improvise all his lines, to the consternation of both the buyer and the company staff, who finally get to meet their ghostly boss.

Cast

 Jens Albinus as The Boss of It All / Kristoffer / Svend E
 Peter Gantzler as Ravn, the owner
 Friðrik Þór Friðriksson as Finnur
 Benedikt Erlingsson as Interpreter
 Iben Hjejle as Lise
 Henrik Prip as Nalle
 Mia Lyhne as Heidi A.
 Casper Christensen as Gorm
 Louise Mieritz as Mette
 Jean-Marc Barr as Spencer
 Sofie Gråbøl as Kisser
 Anders Hove as Jokumsen

Release
The Boss of It All opened in Denmark on 8 December 2006 and earned 1,147,632 kr. The film opened in the United States on 23 May 2007 and earned $51,548. Worldwide, the film grossed $3,111,395.

Critical reception
The film received generally positive reviews. It holds a 75% rating on the review aggregator website Rotten Tomatoes based on 67 reviews. The website's consensus reads, "Director Lars von Trier ditches the pretensions but keeps his misanthropy in The Boss of it All, a surprisingly sharp and witty comedy about office life gone haywire." On Metacritic, the film has a 71/100 rating based on 17 critics, indicating "generally favorable reviews".

Accolades
The film was nominated for two Bodil Awards, three Robert Festival Honours and the Golden Shell at the San Sebastián International Film Festival.

Remake
On February 23, 2011, it was announced that Arrested Development creator Mitch Hurwitz was remaking The Boss of It All for Universal Pictures with Brian Grazer producing.

References

External links
 
 
 
 
 
 The Director Interviews: Lars von Trier, The Boss of It All at Filmmaker Magazine
 'I'm a control freak – but I was not in control' – interview with von Trier
 Slave to cinema – interview with von Trier

2006 films
2000s avant-garde and experimental films
2006 comedy films
Danish avant-garde and experimental films
Danish comedy films
French avant-garde and experimental films
French comedy films
German avant-garde and experimental films
German comedy films
Icelandic comedy films
Swedish avant-garde and experimental films
Swedish comedy films
2000s Danish-language films
2000s English-language films
English-language Danish films
English-language French films
English-language German films
English-language Icelandic films
English-language Italian films
English-language Swedish films
2000s Icelandic-language films
2000s Russian-language films
Films directed by Lars von Trier
2006 multilingual films
Danish multilingual films
French multilingual films
German multilingual films
Swedish multilingual films
2000s French films
2000s German films
2000s Swedish films